List of surviving McDonnell F-101 Voodoos identifies those Voodoos that are on display by country, model number, serial number, and location (museum or park and city); for USAF and other nations Voodoos.

The F-101 (USAF) and CF-101 (Canadian)  were a Cold War supersonic escort fighter, interceptor, and tactical reconnaissance aircraft.

Canada

On display
CF-101B
101008 - Air Force Heritage Park, 17 Wing, Winnipeg, Manitoba.
101011 - Base Borden Military Museum, 16 Wing Borden, Ontario.
101015 - Parc Commémoratif des Vétérans, Lévis, Quebec.
101021 - The Hangar Flight Museum, Calgary, Alberta.
101025 - Canada Aviation and Space Museum, Ottawa, Ontario.
101027 - Bagotville Air Defense Museum, 3 Wing Bagotville, Quebec.
101028 - New Brunswick Railway Museum, Hillsborough, New Brunswick
101030 - Comox Air Force Museum Heritage Air Park, 19 Wing Comox, British Columbia
101035 - Abbotsford International Airport, Abbotsford, British Columbia
101037 - Air Heritage Park, Slemon Park Summerside, Prince Edward Island.
101038 - Reynolds-Alberta Museum, Wetaskiwin, Alberta.
101040 - National Air Force Museum of Canada, 8 wing Trenton, Ontario. 
101043 - Atlantic Canada Aviation Museum, Halifax, Nova Scotia.
101045 - Canadian Warplane Heritage Museum, Hamilton, Ontario.
101051 - Thetford Mines Airport, Thetford Mines, Quebec. 
101053 - Pollard Blvd, Miramichi, New Brunswick
101057 - CFB Comox gate guard, CFB Comox, British Columbia.
101060 - Alberta Aviation Museum, Edmonton, Alberta.
101065 - North Atlantic Aviation Museum, Gander, Newfoundland and Labrador

CF-101F
101002 - Canadian War Museum, Ottawa, Ontario.
101003 - Labrador Military Museum, 5 Wing Goose Bay, Newfoundland and Labrador.
101006 - Jet Aircraft Museum (JAM), London, Ontario.
101022 - McChord Air Museum McChord Field

EF-101B
 CFB North Bay,

France
On display
F-101B
58-0282 Minnesota Air National Guard - Ailes Anciennes Toulouse

Germany
On display
F-101B
58-0265 United States Air Force - Speyer Auto and Technik Museum

Taiwan
On display
RF-101A

54-1499 Republic of China Air Force - Hualien_Airport

54-1505 Republic of China Air Force - Chung Cheng Aviation Museum

54-1506 Republic of China Air Force - Aviation Education Exhibition Hall

United Kingdom

On display
F-101F
56-0312 United States Air Force - Midland Air Museum, Coventry Airport

United States
On display
F-101A
53-2418 - Evergreen Air and Space Museum, McMinnville, Oregon.
53-2422 - While not displayed as such, the aircraft sits derelict on the southeastern edge of the Edwards AFB photo range California, and has been located there since at least 1979.

CF-101B

 101044 - Peterson Air and Space Museum, Peterson AFB, Colorado

F-101B

56-0235 - Yankee Air Museum, Belleville, Michigan.
56-0241 - USAF History and Traditions Museum, Lackland AFB, Texas.
56-0250 - Air Force Armament Museum, Eglin AFB, Florida.
57-0252 - Hill Aerospace Museum, Hill AFB, Utah.
57-0282 - Pima Air & Space Museum, adjacent to Davis-Monthan AFB, Tucson, Arizona.
57-0294 - Washington National Guard Museum, Camp Murray, Washington.
57-0308 - Wilmington Airport Collection, Wilmington Airport, Ohio.
57-0374 - Maine Air National Guard, Bangor Air National Guard Base, Bangor, Maine.

57-0410 - Combat Air Museum, Topeka, Kansas. N8234, nickname, ‘the Gray Ghost'; previously at Colorado State University.
57-0412 - Castle Air Museum, Castle Airport (formerly Castle AFB), Atwater, California.
57-0417 (painted as 56-0417) - Callaway Recreational Complex, Callaway, Florida.
57-0427 - Aerospace Museum of California, McClellan Airport (former McClellan AFB), Sacramento, California.
57-0430 - American Legion Post 4, Mount Clemens, Michigan.
57-0436 - Celebrity Row, Davis-Monthan AFB (North Side), Tucson, Arizona.
58-0271 - Wings Over the Rockies Air and Space Museum at the former Lowry AFB, Denver, Colorado.
58-0273 - Poinsett Weapons Range, Sumter, South Carolina.
58-0274 - Peterson AFB, Colorado. Displayed near the AMC Passenger Terminal, formerly displayed near the West Gate.
58-0281 - Boeing Park, Spirit of St. Louis Airport, Chesterfield, Missouri.
58-0285 - Travis Air Force Base Heritage Center (Jimmy Doolittle Air & Space Museum,), Travis AFB, California.
58-0288 - Air Force Flight Test Center Museum, Edwards AFB, California.
58-0291 - K.I.Sawyer Heritage Museum at the former K.I. Sawyer AFB, K.I. Sawyer, Michigan.
58-0300 - Minnesota ANG Museum, St. Paul, Minnesota.
58-0301 - Portland International Airport/Portland Air National Guard Base, Portland, Oregon.
58-0303 - Glenn L. Martin Aviation Museum, Baltimore, Maryland.
58-0312 - Veteran's Park, Rock Springs, Wyoming.
58-0315 - Grand Forks AFB, North Dakota.
58-0321 - Grissom Air Museum, Grissom ARB (former Grissom AFB), Indiana.
58-0325 - National Museum of the United States Air Force, Wright-Patterson AFB, Dayton, Ohio.
58-0329 - Vietnam Veterans Memorial, Rogers, Arkansas.
58-0332 - Evergreen Aviation & Space Museum, McMinnville, Oregon.
58-0335 - Fairchild AFB, Spokane, Washington.
58-0341 - Fargo ANGB, Fargo, North Dakota.
59-0412 - Tennessee ANGB, Chattanooga, Tennessee.
59-0417 - Pocatello Regional Airport, Pocatello, Idaho. 
59-0418 - March Field Air Museum, March ARB (former March AFB), Riverside, California.
59-0421 - Texas Air Museum, San Antonio, Texas.
59-0423 - Winston Field Airport, Snyder, Texas.
59-0426 - South Dakota Air and Space Museum, Ellsworth AFB, South Dakota.
59-0428 - Air Mobility Command Museum, Dover AFB, Delaware.
59-0429 - Texas Air Museum, Slaton, Texas.
59-0430 - Babe Zaharias Memorial, Beaumont, Texas.
59-0462 - Strategic Air & Space Museum, Ashland, Nebraska.
59-0471 - Historic Aviation Memorial Museum, Tyler, Texas.
RF-101B
59-0483 - May ANGB, Reno, Nevada. 
NF-101B
56-0273 - Rantoul National Aviation Center, Rantoul, Illinois.  Formerly on display at Octave Chanute Aerospace Museum at the former Chanute AFB, Rantoul, Illinois.  When this museum closed, the aircraft was to be sent to Southern Museum of Flight, Birmingham, Alabama.  It was seen still on tarmac behind the former Octave Chanute Aerospace Museum in July 2018. 
F-101C
56-0009 - Sheppard AFB, Wichita Falls, Texas.
RF-101C

56-0048 - Selfridge Military Air Museum, Selfridge ANGB, Mount Clemens, Michigan.
56-0057 - Camp Robinson National Guard Armory, North Little Rock, Arkansas.
56-0068 - Muse Manor front lawn (north), Keesler AFB, Biloxi, Mississippi.
56-0099 - Shaw AFB, South Carolina.
56-0112 - Gila Bend Municipal Airport Gila Bend, Arizona.
56-0119 - in storage at the Paul Garber Facility of the National Air and Space Museum in Silver Hill, Maryland.
56-0125 - The Aviation Museum of Kentucky, Blue Grass Airport, Lexington, Kentucky. 
56-0130 - Gila Bend Municipal Airport, Gila Bend, Arizona.
56-0135 - Maxwell AFB, Alabama.
56-0166 - National Museum of the United States Air Force, Wright-Patterson AFB, Dayton, Ohio.
56-0185 - Niagara Falls ANGB, Niagara Falls, New York. 
56-0210 - Museum of Aviation, Robins AFB, Warner Robins, Georgia.
56-0214 - Pima Air & Space Museum, adjacent to Davis-Monthan AFB, Tucson, Arizona.
56-0217 - George Robert Hall Airpark, Bobby Chain Airport, Hattiesburg, Mississippi.
56-0229 - Museum of Aviation, Warner Robins AFB, Macon, Georgia.
56-0231 - Little Rock AFB, Jacksonville, Arkansas.
F-101F
56-0246 - Air Power Park, Hampton, Virginia.
57-0287 - Linear Air Park, Dyess AFB, Abilene, Texas.
57-0322 - McChord Air Museum, McChord AFB, Washington.
57-0342 - MAPS Air Museum, North Canton, Ohio.
58-0269 - James J. Eagan Civic Center, Florissant, Missouri.
58-0276 - Museum of Aviation, Robins AFB, Warner Robins, Georgia.
58-0290 - Security Police Training Area (north), Kelly Field (formerly Kelly AFB), San Antonio, Texas.
58-0311 - Devils Lake Municipal Airport, Devils Lake, North Dakota.
58-0324 - Heritage Air Park, Palmdale, California.
58-0338 - Buffalo Naval and Servicemens Park, Buffalo, New York
59-0400 - Valiant Air Command Warbird Museum, Space Coast Regional Airport, Titusville, Florida.
59-0407 - Proctor City Ball Park, Proctor, Minnesota.
59-0413 - Empire State Aerosciences Museum, Glenville, New York.
59-0419 - Malmstrom AFB, Great Falls, Montana.
RF-101H
56-0001 - Louisville Air National Guard Base, Louisville International Airport, Louisville, Kentucky.
56-0011 - Ebing ANG - 188th Tactical Fighter Group, Fort Smith, Arkansas.

See also
 McDonnell XF-88 Voodoo
 McDonnell CF-101 Voodoo

References

 AeroWeb's: F-101 Voodoo on Display List of static displays, location, serial numbers, and links.

External links
 List of preserved Canadian Voodoos
 Baugher's F-101 Voodoo Aircraft
 USAF National Museum site: XF-88 page
 Warbirds Resource Group - F-101 Voodoo Registry

McDonnell F-101 Voodoo
McDonnell F-101 Voodoo on display